Marvel Treasury Edition is an American comic book series published by Marvel Comics from 1974 to 1981. It usually featured reprints of previously published stories but a few issues contained new material. The series was published in an oversized 10" x 14" tabloid (or "treasury") format and was launched with a collection of Spider-Man stories. The series concluded with the second Superman and Spider-Man intercompany crossover. Marvel also published treasuries under the titles Marvel Special Edition and Marvel Treasury Special as well as a number of one-shots.

The issues

Marvel Special Edition

Marvel Treasury Special

Other Marvel treasuries 
 MGM's Marvelous Wizard of Oz (1975): The first joint publishing venture between Marvel and DC Comics. Comics adaptation of the Metro-Goldwyn-Mayer film by Roy Thomas, John Buscema, and Tony DeZuniga.
 Marvel Treasury of Oz (1975): Comics adaptation of The Marvelous Land of Oz by Roy Thomas and Alfredo Alcala.
 Special Collector's Edition #1 (1975): "Savage Fists of Kung Fu" reprints stories from Deadly Hands of Kung Fu #1-2; Deadly Hands of Kung Fu Special #1; and Special Marvel Edition #15.
 Superman vs. The Amazing Spider-Man (January 1976): The first crossover between characters of both companies, written by Gerry Conway and drawn by Ross Andru and Dick Giordano.
 2001: A Space Odyssey (1976): Comics adaptation of the Stanley Kubrick film by Jack Kirby. 
 The Funtastic World of Hanna-Barbera 
 #1 (December 1977) "The Flintstones Christmas Party": New story by writer Mark Evanier and artists Kay Wright and Scott Shaw.
 #2 (March 1978) "Yogi Bear's Easter Parade"
 #3 (June 1978) "Laff-A-Lympics"
 Marvel Super Special #8 (1978): Comics adaptation of Battlestar Galactica by Roger McKenzie and Ernie Colón.
 Buck Rogers Giant Movie Edition (1979): Originally published by Western Publishing, second printing published by Marvel.
 G.I. Joe Special Treasury Edition (1982): Treasury format reprint of the first issue of the G.I. Joe: A Real American Hero series.
 Annie Treasury Edition (December 1982): Comics adaptation of the film by Tom DeFalco, Win Mortimer, and Vince Colletta.
 Smurfs Treasury (1983)

See also 
 Limited Collectors' Edition - a similar series published by DC Comics

References

External links 

Marvel Treasury Edition at the Unofficial Handbook of Marvel Comics Creators
 
 
 
 
 

1974 comics debuts
1981 comics endings
Comics anthologies
Comics by George Pérez
Comics by Steve Gerber
Comics formats
Defunct American comics
Marvel Comics titles